Peter George Popoff (born July 2, 1946) is a German-born American televangelist and debunked clairvoyant and faith healer. He was exposed in 1986 for using a concealed earpiece to receive radio messages from his wife, who gave him the names, addresses, and ailments of audience members during Popoff-led religious services. Popoff falsely claimed God revealed this information to him so that Popoff could pretend to cure them through faith healing.

He went bankrupt the next year, but made a comeback in the late 1990s. Beginning in the mid-2000s, Popoff bought TV time to promote "Miracle Spring Water" on late-night infomercials, and referred to himself as a prophet. "We've done so many stories about him, but it never does any good," said Ole Anthony, founder of Trinity Foundation, which has investigated Popoff and other faith healers since 1987. "His scams are endless." "Miracle Spring Water" promotions were still running on TV channels in the United States and Canada in 2023.

Early life and career 
Popoff was born in Occupied Berlin on July 2, 1946, the son of George and Gerda Popoff. As a child, Popoff emigrated with his family to the United States, where he attended Chaffey College before transferring to the University of California, Santa Barbara, from which he graduated in 1970.

Popoff's father preached at revival meetings throughout the United States. Beginning in 1960, Popoff also began making appearances as a preacher. Billed as "The Miracle Boy Evangelist" in print advertisements, the ads also claimed he was born in a West Berlin bomb shelter, and had been rescued from a Siberian prison camp. The powers he claimed included the abilities to heal the sick and foretell the future.

Popoff married his wife Elizabeth in August 1971 and the couple settled in Upland, California. He then began his television ministry that, by the early 1980s, was being broadcast nationally. His miraculous "curing" of chronic and incurable medical conditions became a central attraction of his sermons. Popoff would tell attendees suffering from a variety of illnesses to "break free of the devil" by throwing their prescription pills onto the stage. Many would obey, tossing away bottles of digitalis, nitroglycerine, and other important maintenance medications. Popoff would also "command" supplicants in wheelchairs to "rise and break free". They would stand and walk without assistance, to the joyous cheers of the faithful. Critics later documented that the recipients of these dramatic "cures" were fully ambulatory people who had been seated in wheelchairs by Popoff's assistants prior to broadcasts.

In 1985, Popoff began soliciting donations for a program to provide Bibles to citizens of the Soviet Union by attaching them to helium-filled balloons and floating them into the country. When skeptics asked him to prove that the money he had collected had in fact been spent on Bibles and balloons, Popoff staged a burglary at his own headquarters. On subsequent broadcasts, he tearfully begged for additional donations to help repair the damage.

Investigation by James Randi 
At the height of his popularity in the 1980s, Popoff would accurately announce home addresses and specific illnesses of audience members during his "healing sermons", a feat that he implied was due to divine revelation and "God-given ability". In 1986, the Committee for Skeptical Inquiry charged that Popoff was using electronic transmissions to receive his information; Popoff denied it, insisting that the messages were divinely revealed. Skeptic groups distributed pamphlets explaining how Popoff's feats could be accomplished without any sort of divine intervention. Popoff branded his critics "tools of the devil".

Popoff's methods were definitively exposed in 1986 by the magician and skeptic James Randi and his associate Steve Shaw, an illusionist known professionally as Banachek, with technical assistance from the crime scene analyst and electronics expert Alexander Jason. With a scanner radio, Jason was able to demonstrate that Popoff's wife, Elizabeth, was using a radio transmitter to broadcast information that she and her aides had culled from prayer request cards filled out by audience members. Popoff received the transmissions via a receiver and earpiece he was wearing and repeated the information to astonished audience members. Jason produced video segments interspersing the intercepted radio transmissions with Popoff's "miraculous" pronouncements.

Randi also planted accomplices in Popoff's audiences, including a man dressed as a woman whom Popoff "cured" of uterine cancer at a meeting in Detroit in 1984. Randi and Shaw recorded Elizabeth describing a woman to Popoff as "that big nigger in the back", and warning him, "Keep your hands off those tits ... I'm watching you." At another session, Elizabeth and her aides were heard laughing uncontrollably at the physical appearance of a man suffering from advanced testicular cancer.

In May 1986, Randi presented one of Jason's videos on The Tonight Show Starring Johnny Carson. Popoff initially denied Randi's accusations and accused NBC of "...[hiring] an actress to impersonate Mrs. Popoff on a doctored videotape". Eventually Popoff admitted the existence of the radio device, but claimed that Elizabeth only "occasionally" gave him "the name of a person who needs special prayers". He added that "almost everybody" knew about the radio communication system. Although donations had exceeded over half a million dollars monthly, his ministry's viewer ratings and donations declined significantly after the Carson airing, and in September 1987 he declared bankruptcy, listing more than 790 unpaid creditors and a ministry debt of over $1 million, and personal debts of almost half that. Popoff's attorney, William Simon, "attributed the collapse of his ministry to financial mismanagement more than to disclosures about Popoff." Jason's video footage was also aired on the Nova episode "Secrets of the Psychics" in 1991. The episode was released on video as part of a lesson in critical thinking.

Octogenarian Larry Skelton, a former organist of Popoff from 1965 to 1990, and for Peter's father before that, said: "When you're praying for the sick, it's through the Holy Spirit, and there's some times that it works freely, and then there are other times when the Spirit's just not there." He went on to say that "on the days it didn't show, you still had to pay for the auditorium, so you needed to help the Holy Spirit along." Skelton claimed that he had seen miracles; for instance, a believer whose short leg grew six inches to match the length of his normal leg.

Resurgence 
In 1998, The Washington Post reported that Popoff was making a comeback, seeking to jump-start his ministry by repackaging himself for an African American audience, buying time on the Black Entertainment Television network. Popoff, along with Don Stewart and Robert Tilton, received "criticism from those who say that preachers with a long trail of disillusioned followers have no place on a network that holds itself out as a model of entrepreneurship for the black community".

A February 2007 Inside Edition segment reported that Popoff's new infomercials depict him "healing the sick" in a manner identical to his methods prior to James Randi's exposé. Victims were interviewed, including a married couple who charged that Popoff had taken "thousands of dollars" from them. Popoff refused to comment. "Flim flam is his profession," Randi explained to reporter Matt Meaghan. "That's what he does best. He's very good at it, and naturally he's going to go back to it." In May 2007, ABC's 20/20 focused on Popoff's comeback and explored the lives of a few people who felt cheated. Various other media outlets have run similar stories. In July 2008, a Nanaimo, British Columbia, resident was reimbursed by Popoff after she went public with her concerns over his fundraising tactics.

In 2008, the UK broadcasting regulator Ofcom issued strong warnings to broadcasters for transmitting Popoff's material, which the regulator felt promoted his products "in such a way as to target potential susceptible and vulnerable viewers". These programs included offers of free "Miracle Manna" that allegedly provided health and financial miracles. In 2009, Popoff began running advertisements in UK periodicals offering a free cross containing "blessed water" and "holy sand". The water, he claimed, was drawn from a spring near Chernobyl, Ukraine (the site of the 1986 nuclear reactor disaster). Animals and humans drinking from the spring were purportedly spared radiation sickness. Responders to the ad received a small wooden cross bearing the inscription "Jerusalem" and a solicitation for donations, followed by numerous additional solicitation letters.

Popoff was designated by the James Randi Educational Foundation (JREF) as one of its recipients of the 2011 Pigasus Award for fraudulent practices, along with Mehmet Oz (from The Dr. Oz Show) and CVS Pharmacy. "Debt cancellation is part of God's plan", according to Popoff, who taught that God would respond to prayer and seed-faith by providing financial blessing. Credit.com wrote a blog post concerning Popoff's claims.

In September 2015, Michael Marshall of the Good Thinking Society documented Popoff's latest promises of "fabulous extreme fortune" and "miracles" in exchange for donations to his organization. At a recent London gathering, GTS filmed Popoff "healing" a woman supposedly "wracked with pain", though Marshall and a colleague had previously seen her—in no obvious distress—handing out pens and questionnaires to audience members. Soon after the "healing", they watched her quietly leave the room.

In the mid-2000s, Popoff began to offer "Miracle Spring Water" on late-night infomercials in the US, Canada, the UK, Australia, and New Zealand. Respondents were promised miraculous protection from disease and disability, along with financial prosperity (which might include "divine money transfers directly into your account"), if they slept with the water for one night before drinking it, then prayed over the empty bottle and sent it back to Popoff—with a donation. A deluge of  solicitation letters and token enclosures would follow, requesting more donations in exchange for miracles. Popoff also started referring to himself as a prophet.

Popoff's operation had functioned as a for-profit company until 2006, when it merged with a small church in Farmers Branch, Texas called Word for the World, which operated out of a storefront. Now classified as a church, Popoff's corporation no longer had to report annual income or salary to the IRS. When a reporter from GQ attempted to visit this church on a Sunday morning in late 2016, he found a deserted parking lot in an industrial park with no church sign visible on the outside.

Because of Popoff's history of fraud and financial irregularities, his "People United For Christ" organization earned a "Did Not Disclose" rating with the Better Business Bureau, indicating its refusal to provide information that would enable BBB to determine whether the group adheres to its Standards for Charity Accountability.

Popoff's longtime assistants Reeford and Pamela Sherrell also began a televised Texas-based ministry, with Reeford using the name Pastor Lee Sherrell. Like Popoff, they used the offer of a religious trinket (a free prayer cloth) to compile an address list. Once a follower requested the prayer cloth and input his or her address, letters asking for money were dispatched.

Researcher and bioethics expert Fred M. Frohock cited Popoff as "one of many egregious instances of fake healing." Ole Anthony of the Trinity Foundation, founded in 1987 to research the claims of televangelists, said, "Most of these guys are fooled by their own theology"—referring to other televangelists such as Joel Osteen and T. D. Jakes—but in the case of Popoff, "he's fundamentally evil, because he knows he's a con man."

Financial details 
Popoff was collecting almost $4 million per year in the late 1980s, according to Randi. In 2003, his ministry received over $9.6 million, and in 2005, over $23 million. In that year, he and his wife were paid a combined salary of nearly $1 million, while two of his children received over $180,000 each. Financial data is not available for Popoff's ministry since 2005 because Peter Popoff Ministries changed from a for-profit business to a religious organization in 2006, making it tax-exempt. Popoff purchased a home in Bradbury, California, for $4.5 million in 2007. He drives a Porsche and a Mercedes-Benz.

In popular culture 
The radio transmitter incident was parodied in the 1989 movie "Fletch Lives".

The 1990 album Spiritual Healing by the death metal band Death was inspired by Popoff, and the front cover artwork depict a priest almost identical to him healing a person in a wheelchair.

The 1992 Steve Martin dramedy Leap of Faith was inspired by Popoff's fraudulent ministry, and demonstrated a number of the techniques Popoff and other televangelist scammers use to create the illusion of divine intervention. A 2012 Broadway musical adaptation of the same title was nominated for the Tony Award for Best Musical.

Popoff was also the inspiration for a character in the 2012 thriller film Red Lights, a psychic who uses information fed to him via a hidden earpiece to persuade the audience at his shows that he is receiving personal details psychically. The script includes Elizabeth Popoff's infamous line, "Hello Petey, can you hear me? If you can't, you're in trouble", almost verbatim.

Publications 
 3 Steps to Answered Prayer. Faith Messenger Publications (1981)  (91 pages)
 Calamities, Catastrophes, and Chaos. Faith Messenger Publications (1980) 
 Demons At Your Doorstep. Faith Messenger Publications (1982)  (50 pages)
 Dreams: God's Language for Life More Abundantly. Publisher: People United For Christ (1989)  (88 pages)
 Forecasts for 1987. (1984)  (33 page booklet)
 God Has Promised You Divine Wealth
 God's Abundant Blessings
 Guaranteed Answered Prayer
 Prosperity Thinking Releasing the Power of the Holy Spirit in Your Life Six Things Satan Uses to Rob You of God's Abundant Blessings''. Faith Messenger Publications (1982)  (93 pages)

Notes

References

Further reading

External links 

 Peter Popoff Ministries – Official website
 Peter Popoff Ministries – Official website (archived)
 More of Popoff's Secrets by James Randi (James Randi Educational Foundation)
 Inside Edition from James Randi Educational Foundation, 2007
 
 Skeptics with a K Episode 157 (A special episode covering Marshal Masters visit to Popov's London gathering)

American Charismatics
American fraudsters
American television evangelists
American faith healers
German emigrants to the United States
Hoaxes in the United States
Living people
Religious hoaxes
Religious scandals
Religious controversies in the United States
1946 births
People from Bradbury, California
Chaffey College alumni
American people of Bulgarian descent